The 1907 All-Ireland Senior Hurling Championship Final was the 20th All-Ireland Final and the culmination of the 1907 All-Ireland Senior Hurling Championship, an inter-county hurling tournament for the top teams in Ireland. The match was held at Fraher Field, Dungarvan, on 21 June 1908, between Kilkenny, represented by a club side from Mooncoin, and Cork, represented by a club side from Dungourney. The Munster champions lost to their Leinster opponents on a score line of 3-12 to 4-8.

The game was regarded as the best All-Ireland decider up to that point.

Match details

1
All-Ireland Senior Hurling Championship Finals
Cork county hurling team matches
Kilkenny GAA matches
June 1908 sports events